A general authority is a member of the highest levels of leadership within the Church of Jesus Christ of Latter-day Saints who has administrative and ecclesiastical authority over the church. A general authority's jurisdiction is church-wide, in contrast to the responsibilities of a local authority or an area authority, which relate to a particular area, unit, or department of the church. As a group, the general authorities are often referred to as "the Brethren". As of October 2017, there are 109 general authorities.

Etymology 
The first scriptural use of the term general authority was in minutes of a meeting for the organization of the Presiding High Council in 1834. Though the original minutes did not refer to the term general authorities, the revised minutes, which were included in the 1835 edition of the Doctrine and Covenants, stated that decisions of the Quorum of the Twelve Apostles "can only be called into question by the general authorities of the church in case of transgression." The use of the term general authorities at this time and in this context is generally interpreted to include the First Presidency and the Presiding High Council.

Composition and distinction from general officers 
By definition, general authorities are members of the church's priesthood. In order of precedence, the general authorities include the members of the following leadership organizations:

General officers 
Not all church leaders with church-wide responsibility are considered general authorities. The general presidencies of the church's organizations, which are sustained as general officers of the church, but are not general authorities, include the general presidencies of the following organizations:

 Young Men
 Sunday School
 Relief Society
 Young Women
 Primary

The latter three groups are composed of women and represent the only three organizations in which women are given church-wide authority.

Also excluded from the definition of general authorities are members of the Third through the Twelfth Quorums of the Seventy, who are called area seventies and have responsibilities relating to a limited geographical area, not church-wide authority.

Until 2004, general leadership for the Sunday School and Young Men organizations had historically been filled by general authorities. However, in the church's April 2004 general conference, Thomas S. Monson, of the First Presidency, announced that "a recent decision [has been made] that members of the Quorums of the Seventy [will] not serve in the general presidencies of the Sunday School and Young Men."

Due to this change, no general organization presidencies are composed of general authority seventies. Rather, the general authorities remain active in general church committees and have less jurisdiction over local stakes. Generally, stake presidents now report to area seventies, who in turn report to area presidencies, which are usually composed of general authority seventies.

Typically, general authorities are given the sealing power, while general officers and area seventies are not.

Tenure 
A person is typically called to be a general authority or general officer by a member of the First Presidency or the Quorum of the Twelve. The president of the church and members of the Quorum of the Twelve are typically called for life, although there have been more than a dozen instances when an apostle has been released from his service in the Quorum of the Twelve due to disfellowshipment, excommunication, or resignation.

As with any calling in the church, general authorities and general officers serve "until they are released". In current church practice, men called to the First Quorum of the Seventy typically remain general authorities for life, but are granted emeritus status in the October following their 70th birthday.  Members of the Second Quorum of the Seventy are typically called for a period of five to seven years. When members of the Second Quorum are released, they are no longer general authorities of the church. When members of the presiding bishopric are released, they typically become members of the First Quorum of the Seventy and are therefore retained as lifetime general authorities, including later being granted emeritus status.

Common consent 
In the church's biannual general conferences, held in April and October, all the general authorities and general officers of the church are presented to the Latter-day Saints for a sustaining vote, in accordance with the church's interpretation of the principle of "common consent". This is a voluntary indication made by each member (usually by raising the right hand) that the member assents to be led by the individuals presented as general authorities and general officers. Members of the First Presidency and Quorum of the Twelve Apostles are always named by name, as are any persons being added or released from a position or any general authority or general officer moving from one organization to another (e.g., a member of the First Quorum of the Seventy being called to the Presidency of the Seventy). Otherwise, the general authorities and general officers of the church are simply sustained "as presently constituted".

This biannual procedure is dictated by church theology, which states that the church shall be governed by the common consent of its membership. Dissenting votes are rare and have even more rarely prevented a person from holding the proposed position. General authorities and general officers are also assigned to deliver sermons during the two-day conferences.

General authority firsts

See also 
 Council on the Disposition of the Tithes
List of general authorities of The Church of Jesus Christ of Latter-day Saints

References

External links
Grampa Bill's G.A. Pages : brief biographies of every LDS Church general authority in history

1834 establishments in the United States
1834 in Christianity
 
Leadership positions in the Church of Jesus Christ of Latter-day Saints
Christian religious occupations